Julio Nakpil y García (22 May 1867 – 2 November 1960) was a Filipino musician, composer and a General during the Philippine Revolution against Spain. He was a member of the Katipunan, a secret society turned revolutionary government which was formed to overthrow the Spanish government in the Philippines. His Katipunan adoptive name was J. Giliw or simply Giliw. He was commissioned by Andres Bonifacio, President of the Revolutionary Government, to compose a hymn which was intended to become the National Anthem of the Tagalog Republic. That hymn was entitled "Marangal na Dalit ng Katagalugan". Thus, to some, he is remembered as the composer of the first national anthem of the Philippines. He is also a known critic of Emilio Aguinaldo.

Early life
Julio Nakpil was born on May 22, 1867, as one of the twelve children of a well-off family in Quiapo district of Manila. His parents withdrew him from formal schooling after two years and had him look over the family stable. Julio educated himself at home and eventually learned how to play the piano as customary among the affluent families during that period.

During the outbreak of the Philippine Revolution in August 1896, Julio was appointed as General by the Katipunan Government and was the commander of the revolutionary forces in the northern Philippines under Andrés Bonifacio.

Many of Julio's compositions during this time were inspired directly by the Revolution. Julio composed "Marangal na Dalit ng Katagalugan" which was intended by Bonifacio to become the national anthem of the Philippines but was ultimately replaced for Lupang Hinirang composed by Julián Felipe. After execution of the Bonifacio brothers, Nakpil claimed to have received threats on his own life as well as that of General Antonio Luna, the which latter ending up being assassinated.

Later life
After the Revolution, Nakpil fell in love with and eventually married Bonifacio's widow Gregoria de Jesús. They moved to Manila and raised six children. Their eldest child and the only boy was Juan Nakpil who became a prominent Filipino architect and was recognized as a National Artist for Architecture. Another child married the architect Carlos Santos-Viola. Julio continued to compose until his death in 1960. Before his death he also contributed to a book on his life that was published by his heirs in 1964.

He became a renowned critic of Emilio Aguinaldo, in his memoirs titled Apuntes Sobre la Revolución Filipina (Notes on the Philippine Revolution)
I swear before God and before History that everything related in these notes is the truth and I entreat the historian not to publish this until after my death." On page 30 of his memoirs can be found Nakpil's notes on the death of Bonifacio, and on page 130 is his account of the assassination of Antonio Luna where Nakpil wrote "When General A. Luna was dastardly assassinated by Janolino and his men on the stairs of the Convent of Kabanatuan and already fallen on the ground, Trinidad Aguinaldo the mother of Emilio Aguinaldo looked out the window and asked: Ano, humihinga pa ba? (So, is he still breathing?) (according to Nakpil's acoount)

On pages 157-158, Nakpil wrote of Aguinaldo,

''"Emilio Aguinaldo's surrender to the Americans was a cowardly act. There was no doubt that he coveted the presidency. He surrendered for fear that others more competent than he would occupy the post of president of the Republic.
Had he fought with his captors, regardless of whether he succumbed so that he might be considered a hero, at least to vindicate his crimes, by this time we would be admiring a monument to the second hero of the Philippines, unlike what he did delivering himself as prisoner and afterward taking an oath of allegiance to the American flag."''

Death
He died of heart attack at his home on November 2, 1960, in Quiapo, Manila. He was buried at Manila North Cemetery in Santa Cruz, Manila the next day.

Legacy
The house where Nakpil and de Jesús lived, known as Bahay Nakpil-Bautista, still stands in Quiapo and is maintained by his heirs as a museum that also offers walking tours of Quiapo and other special events and doubles as a performance area. Bahay Nakpil-Bautista is the one of the two Spanish-style structures left standing in Bautista Street, Quiapo, Manila, the other being Casa Boix.

Compositions

References

External links
Biographical Website

People from Quiapo, Manila
Musicians from Manila
Filipino composers
People of the Philippine Revolution
1867 births
1960 deaths
Burials at the Manila North Cemetery